WFRO may refer to: 

 WFRO, a defunct radio station (900 AM) formerly licensed to Fremont, Ohio, United States
 WFRO-FM, a radio station (99.1 FM) licensed to Fremont, Ohio, United States